{{Speciesbox 
| status = LC
| status_system = IUCN3.1
| status_ref = 
| genus = Ctenophorus
| species = rubens
| authority = (Storr, 1965)
| synonyms = *Amphibolurus isolepis rubens 
Ctenophorus isolepis rubens 
Phthanodon rubens 
| synonyms_ref = 
| range_map = Ctenophorus_rubens_distribution.png
| range_map_caption = Distribution of Ctenophorus rubens
}}Ctenophorus rubens, commonly known as the reddening sand-dragon or rufus sand dragon, is a species of agamid lizard occurring in the arid sandy areas of shrublands and spinifex of the Exmouth Gulf and the adjacent interior of Western Australia, with an isolated population also occurring in the sand dunes south of Hamelin Pool, Western Australia. It was formerly considered to be a subspecies of C. isolepis''.

References 

Agamid lizards of Australia
rubens
Endemic fauna of Australia
Reptiles described in 1965
Taxa named by Glen Milton Storr